Marin Kajiki (梶木真凜, born 20 September 1999) is a Japanese rugby sevens player. She competed in the women's tournament at the 2020 Summer Olympics. She was named in the Sakura Sevens squad to compete at the 2022 Rugby World Cup Sevens in Cape Town.

References

External links
 

1999 births
Living people
Female rugby sevens players
Olympic rugby sevens players of Japan
Rugby sevens players at the 2020 Summer Olympics
Sportspeople from Fukuoka (city)
Japan international women's rugby sevens players
21st-century Japanese women